Daniel Cazés Menache (13 September 1939, México City – 20 December 2012) was a Mexican anthropologist and gender studies scholar.

Works
"Indigenismo en México. Pasado y presente", en Historia y sociedad (1963)
"El pueblo matlatzinca de San Francisco Oxtotilpan y su lengua" (1965)
prólogo de El desarrollo del subdesarrollo, de A. G. Frank (1967)
Tres culturas en agonía (con S. Arguedas, F. Carmona y J. Carrión, 1969)
Los revolucionarios (1971)
Epigraphie Maya et linguistique mayanne (París, 1975)
"Memorias de mi relación con el feminismo y las feministas", en Fem (1981)
La Universidad Autónoma de Puebla en 1981 (introducción y coordinación, 4 tt., 1984–1985)
La restructuración de la Universidad Autónoma de Puebla (1984)
"Con el feminismo en casa" en DobleJornada (1989), suplemento del periódico La Jornada
"Democracia y desmasificación en la universidad pública", en Universidad Nacional y democracia, de S. Zermeño, cooordinador (1991)
Relato a muchas voces. Memorial del 68 (selección, edición y prólogo), Serie Atrás de la Raya. Desarrollo de Medios/La Jornada, 2a. ed., México (junio 1994),  y Una crónica del 68
"Normas del hombre verdadero en Kafka y Sartre. Pasos para una metodología de la masculinidad crítica", en Actas del XIII Congreso Internacional de Ciencias Antropológicas y Etnológicas
"Desesperanza y posmodernidad. A 48 años de Hiroshima y Nagasaki", en "La Jornada Semanal", suplemento dominical de La Jornada (1993)
"God y Alá", en "La Jornada Semanal", suplemento dominical de La Jornada (1993)
"Autonomía universitaria y Estado en México", en El nuevo Estado mexicano, coord. J. Alonso
Tecnología ciudadana para la democracia (con E. Calderón)
"La dimensión social del género: posibilidades de vida para mujeres y hombres en el patriarcado", en Antología de la Sexualidad Humana
"Masculinidad y pareja en la Carta al padre de Kafka", en La pareja o Hasta que la muerte nos separe: ¿Un sueño imposible?, coord. T. Döring (1994)
Volver a nacer. Memorial del 85 (introducción y coordinación)
"Desmasificación universitaria", en Democracia y pluralidad en la universidad
"Masculinidades de hoy: realidad y alternativas", en DobleJornada (1995), suplemento del periódico La Jornada
Las elecciones presidenciales de 1994 (con E. Calderón), Testimonios de observadores. Memorial de las elecciones de 1994 (estudios y coordinación), Metodología de la observación ciudadana, libro electrónico, coordinación, Prólogo a Democracia y medios: un binomio inexplorado de F. Toussaint, y Directorio Electrónico Nacional de la Investigación en Ciencias y Humanidades (1996)
«Metodología de género en los estudios de hombres», en "La investigación sobre las mujeres en América Latina (Managua y Guadalajara)", capítulo 6 de Las alzadas, coord. S. Lovera y N. Palomo
"Taller de género", con M. Lagarde (1997)
"Memorial de Chiapas. Pedacitos de historia" (convocatoria y coordinación)
"La creación de alternativas" (estudio preliminar y coordinación)
"El DF en 1997: los retos del gobierno y de la sociedad civil" (coordinación con L. Álvarez) (1997)
"1968 en 1998", guión para la escenificación en la exposición 30 años después en la UNAM
"El 68 en 1998". Revista X, "Work among men in Latin America. Investigation and practices, results and experiences" en Seminar on men, family formation and reproduction (Lieja-Buenos Aires)
La creación de Subdelegaciones de Cultura, Educación y Género en las Delegaciones del Gobierno de la Ciudad de México, Tlalpan DF
"El feminismo y los hombres", Revista UNAM y "La perspectiva de género. Guía para la formulación, la puesta en marcha, el seguimiento y la evaluación de investigaciones y acciones gubernamentales y cívicas" (con la asesoría de M. Lagarde y la colaboración de B. Lagarde, 1998)
"Paternidades vividas y paternidades vislumbradas al final del milenio", en Coloquio del Día del Padre, y "Algunos hombres en El segundo sexo" en Jornadas de Homenaje a S. de Beauvoir en el 50 aniversario de la publicación de El segundo sexo (Buenos Aires, 1999).

References

1939 births
2012 deaths
People from Mexico City
University of Paris alumni
Academic staff of the National Autonomous University of Mexico
Mexican anthropologists
Men and masculinities scholars
Mexican expatriates in France